Baptist World Mission (BWM) is an independent, Baptist missionary agency located at 201 Gordon Drive SW in Decatur, Alabama. BWM was established in 1961 (see history section below). BWM serves more than 330 missionaries in over 50 countries worldwide, their sending churches, and over 4,200 churches and individuals who financially support them.

Sources
https://web.archive.org/web/20090107090041/http://www.baptistworldmission.org/BWM/Pages/History_of_BWM/History_of_WCBM.html
https://web.archive.org/web/20090107084440/http://www.baptistworldmission.org/BWM/Pages/History_of_BWM/History_of_BWM.html

External links 
 Be Ye Holy: The Call to Christian Separation
 http://www.bjupress.com/product/126425
 https://web.archive.org/web/20100131053157/http://www.mbbc.edu/seminary/
 Baptist World Mission

Christian organizations established in 1961
Independent Baptist missionary societies
1961 establishments in Alabama
Decatur, Alabama